Kadłub may refer to the following places in Poland:
Kadłub, Lower Silesian Voivodeship (south-west Poland)
Kadłub, Podlaskie Voivodeship (north-east Poland)
Kadłub, Łódź Voivodeship (central Poland)
Kadłub, Opole Voivodeship (south-west Poland)